Boxing was contested at the 2013 Summer Universiade from July 5 to 10 at the Boxing Centre in Kazan, Russia.

Medal summary

Medal table

Men's events

References

External links
2013 Summer Universiade – Boxing
Results book

2013 in boxing
2013 Summer Universiade events
2013